Fairy Cave Quarry is between Stoke St Michael and Oakhill in the limestone of the Mendip Hills, in Somerset, England.

Quarrying was first started on the site in the early 1920s. In 1963 the quarry was acquired by Hobbs (Quarries) Ltd., and production on a much larger scale began. Excavations cut back into the hillside above St Dunstan's Well Rising, a Bristol Water abstraction point (long since abandoned); various caves were intercepted. The quarry ceased production in 1977.

The caves in Fairy Cave Quarry include:
Balch Cave
Conning Tower Cave
Fairy Cave
Fernhill Cave
Hillier's Cave
Hillwithy Cave
Shatter Cave
W/L Cave
Withyhill Cave

The caves in the quarry were formed by water from an unknown source. Withybrook Slocker is an active swallet to the south of the quarry and although the water sinking here presently flows through the quarry caves the stream is misfit.  Withybrook Slocker, however, gives access to the upstream continuation of the quarry caves and digging activities by the Cerberus Spelaeological Society will hopefully lead to the discovery of the original source of the system.

The quarry has also been used extensively for climbing, with 172 named routes. Although this was previously without permission of the landowners, in July 2010 access for climbers was agreed.

See also 
 Caves of the Mendip Hills
 Quarries of the Mendip Hills

References

External links 
 Geological Conservation Review

Quarries in the Mendip Hills
Geology of Somerset